Arta Velika (also Arta Vela) is an uninhabited island in Croatia, in central Dalmatia, part of the Šibenik archipelago off the coast of the city of Šibenik. It lies 2.5 km northwest of the island of Murter and the settlement nearest to the island is Pakoštane, 5 km away on the mainland. The island's area is 1.27 km2 and its coastline is 5.53 km long. The highest point on the island is Velika Glava, which is 95 meters high.

References

Islands of Croatia
Islands of the Adriatic Sea
Uninhabited islands of Croatia
Landforms of Šibenik-Knin County